Saint-Martin-Lys (Languedocien: Sant Martin de Les) is a commune in the Aude department in southern France.

Population

History 
The abbey of Saint-Martin-Lys appears in the texts in 898 when the monk Leuva gave the monastery a vineyard located in Cailla . She then receives many donations throughout the Viscount Fenouillèdes . Pope Agapet II confirmed his possessions in 954. The monks then cultivate vineyards, olive trees and cereals. The monastery has a tine or cellars where are brought to Brugens crops in the region, today in the municipality of Caudies Fenouilledes.

Geography 
Municipality located in the upper valley of the Aude, legally part of the Fenouillèdes, the small village of Saint-Martin-Lys is between two gorges (near the parade of Pierre-Lys ). Overlooked by two mountains, the village borders the Aude.

See also
Communes of the Aude department

References

Communes of Aude
Aude communes articles needing translation from French Wikipedia